The 1932 Indiana gubernatorial election was held on November 8, 1932. Democratic nominee Paul V. McNutt defeated Republican nominee Raymond S. Springer with 55.02% of the vote.

General election

Candidates
Major party candidates
Paul V. McNutt, Democratic, Chairman of the Indiana Democratic Party
Raymond S. Springer, Republican, former judge of the 37th Judicial Circuit Court

Other candidates
Powers Hapgood, Socialist
F. W. Lough, Prohibition
Ward B. Hiner, Independent
Theodore Luesse, Communist
Charley Lynch, Socialist Labor

Results

References

1932
Indiana
Gubernatorial